Kryonerida is a former municipality in the Chania regional unit, Crete, Greece. Since the 2011 local government reform it is part of the municipality Apokoronas, of which it is a municipal unit. The seat of the municipality of Kryonerida was the large village of Vryses. Vryses became the seat of the new municipality Apokoronas. It is located in foothills of the White Mountains (Lefka Ori).

Subdivisions
The municipal unit Kryonerida is subdivided into the following communities (constituent villages in brackets):
 Vryses (Vryses, Metochi, Filippos)
 Alikampos
 Vafes (Vafes, Arevitis, Achatzikia)
 Emprosneros (Emprosneros, Vatoudiaris)
 Nippos
 Maza (Maza, Fones, Champatha)

See also
List of settlements in the Chania regional unit

References

External links
Map of Kryonerida

Populated places in Chania (regional unit)